John Flemming (born March 10, 1967 in Halifax, Nova Scotia) is a Canadian professional racing driver. Flemming currently drives the #97 Happy Harry's Affordable Building Dodge for Flemming Motorsports in the Parts For Trucks Pro Stock Tour.

Racing career

Early career

Flemming entered a demolition derby in 1984, winning it, and catching the racing bug. The following year Flemming entered the street stock division at Scotia Speedworld in Enfield, Nova Scotia, just across the highway from the Halifax International Airport. He would race locally at Scotia Speedworld for the next ten years before deciding to make the jump to the MASCAR series, which was the predecessor to the Maritime Pro Stock Tour, in 1994.

Maritime Pro Stock Series

Flemming is a five-time champion on the Maritime Pro Stock Tour circuit, winning the title in 2002, 2003, 2006, 2013, and 2014.

He won his biggest race of his career in 2012 at the annual IWK 250 at Riverside International Speedway, leading 142 laps and finishing ahead of Jonathan Hicken and NASCAR regular Joey Logano. He would win the 250 again in 2014, this time edging out local favourite Donald Chisholm.

NASCAR Canadian Tire Series

Flemming made his NASCAR Canadian Tire Series debut at the 2011 Komatsu 300 at Riverside International Speedway for NOVA Racing, finishing a respectable 12th.

He made his second career start, again at Riverside, in 2014, this time bring it home in 9th for his first career top 10.

Flemming was scheduled to return to Riverside in 2015 to make his third career start, this time for his own team. A day before the event Flemming decided to put D. J. Casey in the car instead. Flemming was impressed by Casey's performance in the Parts For Trucks Pro Stock Tour and upon learning about his dream to race a NASCAR event, decided to give the 20-year-old Casey a shot. Casey made the most of his opportunity, finishing an impressive 10th.

Personal life

John is married to Donna Flemming and the couple has two children, Cody and Taylor. When not racing John works as a longshoreman in Halifax.

Motorsports career results

NASCAR

(key) (Bold – Pole position awarded by qualifying time. Italics – Pole position earned by points standings or practice time. * – Most laps led.)

Canadian Tire Series

Maritime Pro Stock Tour

IWK 250 results

  Event run as part of the Pro All Stars Series

References

External links
 

1967 births
Canadian racing drivers
Living people
Racing drivers from Nova Scotia
Sportspeople from Halifax, Nova Scotia